Summation is a mathematical operation.

Summation may also refer to:
 Addition
 Summation (neurophysiology), a way of achieving action potential in a neuron
 In law, a closing argument

See also 
 Sum (disambiguation)
 Summary (disambiguation)